Yana Urqu (Quechua yana black, urqu mountain, "black mountain", also spelled Yana Orkho) is a  mountain in the Bolivian Andes. It is located in the Potosí Department, Chayanta Province, Ravelo Municipality.

References 

Mountains of Potosí Department